Poland–North Korean relations are foreign relations between Poland and North Korea.

Poland is one of the few countries that maintain diplomatic and limited trading (fishing) relations with Democratic People's Republic of Korea.

North Korea maintains an embassy in Warsaw, and Poland in Pyongyang. , the North Korean ambassador is Il Choe.

According to a 2013 BBC World Service Poll, only 5% of Poles view North Korea's influence positively, with 68% expressing a negative view.

Overview

Poland recognized the DPRK on 16 October 1948 as the sole legitimate government of the whole Korea, when both countries had Soviet-installed communist regimes. From June 1956 until 1993, Poland remained part of the NNSC (Neutral Nations Supervisory Commission) named by the DPRK and Chinese Volunteers to carry out inspections and investigations as part of the armistice agreement. When Poland and Czechoslovakia ceased to be communist, the Korean People's Army took over the camps and expelled the Poles and Czechs. In 1989, Poland lost its status as a "friend" and its privileged position in contacts with the DPRK. Despite the change from communism to capitalism in Poland in 1989 and Poland's establishing relations with South Korea, relations between Poland and DPRK remain at a fair level.

Poland also provides North Korea with small grants in farming equipment and medicine.

Trade relations 
From 1967 economic relations between the two countries were maintained at the symbolic level of trade and sailing co-operation (the Polish-Korean company CHOPOL Sp. z.o.o. owned one ship). The value of trade in 2007 was  million, including Polish exports at  million:

 Polish exports:  million
 Polish imports:  million

The most important goods exported by Poland were meats and other food products, mechanical and electronic tools as well as clothing products.

After a period of inactivity the company was liquidated in 2018.

Diplomatic relations 

Poland maintains its embassy in Pyongyang and DPRK maintains its embassy in Warsaw. , The Republic of Poland and DPRK have signed 16 bilateral treaties, 12 as the Polish People's Republic and 4 as the Republic of Poland.

Official visits between the countries
Polish visits to North Korea:

 1986 - Chairman Wojciech Jaruzelski
 2007 - Vice Minister of Foreign Affairs of Poland (political consultations)
 2004 - Vice Minister of Foreign Affairs of Poland (political consultations)
 2001 - Vice Minister of Foreign Affairs of Poland (political consultations)

Korean visits to Poland:

 1956 - Premier Kim il Sung
 1984 - President Kim il Sung
 2008 - Vice Minister of Foreign Affairs of the DPRK (political consultations)

See also
Koreans in Poland
Poland–South Korea relations

References

Further reading

 
Poland
Bilateral relations of Poland